"Magia" is the first single of Álvaro Soler from his similarly titled album Magia. The single was released on 5 March 2021. Written by Alexander Zuckowski, Simon Triebel, Jakke Erixson and the singer himself Alvaro Tauchert Soler, it charted in a number of European charts.

Charts

Weekly charts

Year-end charts

Certifications

References

2021 songs
Álvaro Soler songs